The Telemann Museum is a museum in the Composers Quarter in Hamburg-Neustadt, Germany. It was founded in 2011 and is dedicated to the classical composer Georg Philipp Telemann.

The museum is situated in an historical building in  the Peterstraße, where Telemann lived and worked from 1721 until his death in 1767. The presentation highlights his personality, including his passion for his botanic garden, and the significance he had musically and culturally in his era.

A great deal of the musical attention is spent to his compositions for the civilians and of church music. The museum houses old archives and maintains an extensive library of books that center around the history of music and culture of the 18th century. The exposition shows first issues and a number of utensils, like an original spinet from 1730 of the builder Thomas Hitchcock. This instrument is used during music performances in the museum.

Impression

See also 
 List of museums in Germany
 List of music museums

References 

Music museums in Germany
Museums in Hamburg
Museums established in 2011
2011 establishments in Germany
Biographical museums in Germany
Georg Philipp Telemann